Elachista spinigera is a moth of the family Elachistidae. It is found in Turkmenistan.

The length of the forewings is about 3.7 mm. The ground colour of the forewings is white, with three brown spots. The hindwings are brownish. Adults have been recorded in August.

References

spinigera
Moths described in 1990
Moths of Asia